The Federal Tax Police Service of the Russian Federation (In Russian: Федеральная служба налоговой полиции Российской Федерации) was subordinate to the President of Russia and was one of the powerful law enforcement agencies in Russia. It existed from 1992 to 2003.

History
The Federal Tax Police of Russia was established on the basis of the Fifth Chief Directorate of the KGB who was responsible for censorship and internal security against artistic, political, and religious dissension; renamed "Directorate Z" (protecting the Constitutional order) in 1989. In 1991, after the KGB was disestablished, the Directorate was closed.

On March 18, 1992 in accordance with Presidential Decree No. 262, The General Directorate of Tax Investigations was formed as part of the State Tax Service of the Russian Federation (In Russian: Главное управление налоговых расследований при Государственной налоговой службе Российской Федерации) with a nominal strength of 12,000 people. The Office was headed by a Former KGB general, Vladimir B. Yampolsky.

On May 20, 1993 the Law "On Federal Tax Police Bodies" was adopted, whereby as the successor GUNR established by the Department of Tax Police of the Russian Federation (on the Rights of the State Committee of Russia). On the same day the Supreme Council of the Russia (The Low House of the Parliament) approved the Status of the service in the tax police. On 11 October 1993 the Russian Government approved the Regulations on the Tax Police Department of the Russian Federation (Департаменте налоговой полиции Российской Федерации) and the list of positions which are assigned to a special rank tax police. Established staffing level of the federal tax police: on January 1, 1994: 21,500 units; on January 1, 1995: 43,800 units (later the number of staff reaches 53,000 units excluding staff). To Director of the Department was appointed Sergey Nikolaievich Almazov.

The Federal law No. 200-FZ of December 17, 1995 the Law "On Federal Tax Police Bodies" amended. In accordance with the Tax Police Department who was renamed to the Federal Tax Police Service (Федеральную службу налоговой полиции). According to the state director of the Tax Police places a limit on special military rank of Colonel-General of Tax Police, the Deputy Director and heads of key departments (surgical, investigative, tax audits, self-protection, physical security, personnel, organizational-inspection, operational, technical and search) - Lieutenant-General Tax Police.

The main task of the youngest at the time law enforcement agency empowered to conduct operational-investigative, expert and investigative activities, mounted combat tax crimes and offenses, as well as fighting corruption in the tax authorities.

The Decree of the Acting Russian President Vladimir Putin on March 16, 2000 in recognition of the importance of the federal tax police in ensuring the economic security has been established professional holiday - The Day of the tax police. Russian Tax Police was the law enforcement agency that is fully reimbursed for their content. During 2001 the federal bodies of tax police filed more than 36,000 criminal cases, the amount of damages for consummated criminal cases was about 27 billion rubles, only as a result of operational activity in the Federal Tax Police Service budget is returned more than 100 billion rubles. Revealed more than 150,000 administrative violations, impose administrative fines worth several hundred million rubles.

Tax police take oath
In the Federal Tax Police Service was established Academy of Tax Police, and several other educational institutions. Published the newspaper "The tax police". On television director Apasyanom was created series about the tax police: "Maroseyka, 12". Publication of the book detective genre of the tax police, among them books department staff writer Nikolai Ivanov ("The Department of Tax Police", and others).

In some other countries of CIS and Lithuania were established similar offices. Subsequently, the Kazakh tax police was transformed into the financial police, in charge of fighting corruption.

On July 1, 2003, by decree No. 306 signed by Russian President Vladimir Putin on March 11, 2003, the Federal Tax Police Service was abolished without any explanation. Most functions of the Tax Police of Russia and the staff at 16,000 units transferred to the Directorate for Taxations Crimes of the Russian Ministry of Internal Affairs. Material base and 40,000 staff units transferred to the newly created State Drug Control Committee.

Directors of Federal Tax Police
 Vladimir Yampolsky (1991 – 1993)
  (1993 – February 18, 1999)
  (March 22, 1999 – March 28, 2001)
 Mikhail Fradkov (2001 – March 11, 2003)

External links

Information on the Federal Tax Police in Agentura
Russian Federal Tax Police

Government agencies established in 1992
2003 disestablishments in Russia
Government of Russia
KGB
Taxation in Russia
1992 establishments in Russia
Defunct government agencies of Russia
Ministry of Internal Affairs (Russia)